Ivica Džidić (born 8 February 1984) is a Croatian former professional footballer who last played for NK Široki Brijeg.

Club career
He played for Dinamo Zagreb's junior team before returning to Zrinjski as their captain.

He signed for Mons on 30 May 2008. He failed some tests at FC Dender, because of a bad knee, where he wanted to sign a contract for 4 years. In 2010, he joined Široki Brijeg.

International career
Džidić has played for Croatian under-20 national team.

References

External links 
 

1984 births
Living people
Sportspeople from Mostar
Croats of Bosnia and Herzegovina
Bosnia and Herzegovina emigrants to Croatia
Association football defenders
Croatian footballers
HŠK Zrinjski Mostar players
R.A.E.C. Mons players
K.V. Oostende players
NK Široki Brijeg players
Premier League of Bosnia and Herzegovina players
Belgian Pro League players
Challenger Pro League players
Croatian expatriate footballers
Expatriate footballers in Bosnia and Herzegovina
Croatian expatriate sportspeople in Bosnia and Herzegovina
Expatriate footballers in Belgium
Croatian expatriate sportspeople in Belgium